Chan Chin-wei and Chuang Chia-jung were the defending champions, but Chuang chose not to participate. Chan partnered Lee Ya-hsuan and successfully defended her title, defeating Hong Seung-yeon and Kang Seo-kyung in the final, 6–2, 6–1.

Seeds

Draw

References 
 Draw

Lecoq Seoul Open - Doubles